Leif Omdahl Enger (September 5, 1900 – November 11, 1977) was a Norwegian actor.

Enger was born in Christiania (now Oslo). He appeared in a series of roles for the Norwegian Broadcasting Corporation's radio theater. He was also a popular film actor, appearing in over 20 films. Among the best-known films he appeared in are Operasjon Løvsprett, Hunger, and Englandsfarere. Enger died in Oslo and is buried in Oslo's West Cemetery.

Partial filmography 

1923: Strandhugg paa Kavringen as Skurken
1934: Op med hodet! as Skuespiller
1933: Jeppe på bjerget as Musicus
1941: The Sausage-Maker Who Disappeared as engineer Barratt
1941: Gullfjellet as Larsen
1946: Englandsfarere as Jacob Vollen
1946: Vi vil leve
1946: Fun and Fancy Free as Willie the Giant
1948: Trollfossen as the chauffeur
1951: Storfolk og småfolk as Tjenere
1951: Alice in Wonderland as the walrus
1952: Veslefrikk med fela as the bailiff
1953: Peter Pan as George Darling and the Indian Chief
1957: Peter van Heeren
1958: På tokt med terna
1958: Bustenskjold
1960: Millionær for en aften
1961: Oss atomforskere i mellom
1962: Operasjon Løvsprett as the general
1964: Klokker i måneskinn as the art dealer in "The Journalist’s Tale"
1964: Nydelige nelliker as Harry
1966: Hunger as Colonel Schinkel (uncredited)
1968: De ukjentes marked as Laseth, a homeless man
1968: Olsen-Banden operasjon Egon as the suspicious man
1970: Ballad of the Masterthief Ole Hoiland as a man in the company (final film role)

References

External links

Leif Enger at Svensk Filmdatabas

1900 births
1977 deaths
Norwegian male stage actors
Norwegian male film actors
Norwegian male silent film actors
Norwegian male radio actors
20th-century Norwegian male actors
Male actors from Oslo